Connor Thomas Barth (born April 11, 1986) is a former American football placekicker who played ten seasons in the National Football League (NFL). He played college football at North Carolina and was signed by the Kansas City Chiefs as an undrafted free agent in 2008.

Barth has been a member of the Miami Dolphins, Denver Broncos, Tampa Bay Buccaneers, New Orleans Saints and the Chicago Bears. He currently holds the highest field goal percentage in Buccaneers franchise history, a record he achieved during the 2011 season. He also broke another franchise record during the 2012 season in which he made 25 consecutive field goals. He is also the most accurate kicker in Buccaneers history, converting 83.8 percent of his field goal attempts (114-of-136) with the club. His 114 field goals, 135 PATs, and 447 points all rank third in franchise history. Barth holds the Buccaneers franchise record for consecutive field goals made with 25.

Barth is currently a real estate agent for Intracoastal Realty in Wilmington, North Carolina.

Personal life
Barth is the son of Thomas and Susan Barth. His younger brother, Casey, was also a placekicker for the North Carolina Tar Heels football team.

Early years
Barth learned to kick under the tutelage of Brian Cardone in Wilmington, North Carolina.  Barth was named to the first-team high school All-America by USA Today during his prep career at John T. Hoggard High School in Wilmington. He played in the U.S. Army All-American Bowl, where he was named the top kicker in the combine. He was selected to the inaugural EA Sports High School All-America Team. Out of high school, Barth was considered one of the best kickers in the country by most recruiting services. He set the North Carolina state record for field goals in a season and career with 38. The Charlotte Observer ranked him among the top 25 overall players in the state of North Carolina. In 2002, he had a string of 40 consecutive extra points. Playing as a punter and a kicker, Barth made 11 of 14 field goals that year. He also was 53 of 54 on extra point attempts as a Junior. He kicked 75 percent of his kickoffs into the end zone. As a punter, he punted 42 times for a 38.2-yard average.

College career
In 2004, as a freshman at the University of North Carolina at Chapel Hill, Barth was named second-team freshman All-America by the Rivals.com recruiting network. He was also an honorable-mention All-ACC member. In 2004, he made 14 of 18 field goals and 35 of 37 extra point attempts. He is well known for a 42-yard game-winning field goal as time expired against #3 Miami. He made his first career field goal on a 22-yard attempt at Virginia.

In 2005, as a sophomore, Barth made 11 of 21 field goals. He struggled throughout the season, but connected on eight of his last ten field goal attempts.

In 2006, as a junior, Barth made all 10 field goal attempts and 24 of 26 extra points. He was the only kicker in the country with a perfect field goal percentage. In a game against North Carolina State, Barth made a 54-yarder that was his career best and tied for the second-longest in school history.

In 2007, as a senior, Barth made 19 of 22 field goals and 30 of his final 33 attempts, dating back to his sophomore season. He earned first-team All-ACC honors from Rivals.com and honorable mention all-conference honors from the Associated Press. Against Miami, Barth kicked a career-high four field goals in the 33-27 win and was named the ACC special teams player of the week. He graduated UNC with a Communications major.

Barth previously held the UNC record for most made field goals (54). His brother, Casey Barth, now holds the current record (55)

Statistics

Professional career

Kansas City Chiefs
Barth was signed as an undrafted free agent by the Kansas City Chiefs in 2008.

Barth made his NFL debut on October 26, 2008, against the New York Jets.

Barth failed to beat out Nick Novak for the team's placekicking job and was waived by the Chiefs on August 29, 2008.

Barth was re-signed by the team on October 21 after Novak was released, becoming the seventh kicker on the Chiefs roster in two years. In his first NFL game, Barth went 1-for-1 on field goal attempts and 3-for-3 on extra points. He remained perfect up until a week 15 game (going in he was 9-for-9) where he missed two field goal attempts, including what would have been a game winning 50 yard field goal as time expired.

Barth was waived by the Chiefs on July 28, 2009, in favor of Ryan Succop.

Miami Dolphins
Barth was signed by the Miami Dolphins on August 10, 2009 to compete with incumbent Dan Carpenter. However, the Dolphins waived Barth on August 29.

Tampa Bay Buccaneers

Barth was signed by the Buccaneers on November 3, 2009 after the Buccaneers released Shane Andrus.  Barth tied an NFL record held by three other kickers when he made three field goals of 50 yards or more against the Miami Dolphins on November 15, 2009; the kicks were from 51, 50, and 54 yards. The record is shared with Morten Andersen, Neil Rackers, Kris Brown, and Josh Scobee.

On December 27, 2009, Barth kicked a 47-yard overtime field goal to give the Buccaneers the win over the New Orleans Saints, 20–17.

On October 10, 2010, Barth kicked a 31-yard field goal with :01 left in the game to give the Buccaneers a 24-21 lead over the Cincinnati Bengals.

On October 24, 2010, Barth had a season-long 53-yard field goal against the St. Louis Rams, while going 4-of-4 on field goal attempts, setting a new career-high for field goals made and tying his career high for attempts.

On October 16, 2011, Barth recorded career-high 14 points (four field goals and two extra points) in the 26–20 win against the New Orleans Saints.

On December 4, 2011, Barth went 4-for-4 on field goal attempts, converting from 50, 47, 46, and 44 yards, in the first half against the Carolina Panthers. He became just the third NFL player in history to record four-plus field goals of 40 or more yards in one half.

Barth the set franchise record with a 92.9 field goal percentage (26-28) in 2011, shattering Steve Christie's 85.2 percent (23-27) in 1990.

On October 25, 2012, Barth kicked three field goals and three extra points for a season-high 12 points in the 36–17 win against the Minnesota Vikings.

On November 4, 2012, Barth kicked a career-high six extra points in the 42-32 win against the Oakland Raiders.

At the end of the 2012 season, Barth finished 11th in the league with a career-high 123 points. Barth also set a single-season franchise record with six field goals of 50 or more yards.

On July 17, 2013, Barth was placed on injured reserve and missed the 2013 season with an Achilles injury suffered while taking part in a charity basketball game. Barth was replaced by veteran placekicker Rian Lindell.

During the 2013 offseason, the Buccaneers signed rookie Patrick Murray to compete with Barth.

On August 29, 2014 Barth was released by the Buccaneers, losing to Murray.

Denver Broncos
On November 25, 2014, Barth signed with the Denver Broncos after they released their previous kicker, Brandon McManus. During his five games in 2014, Barth tied the Broncos record of five field goals in a game twice. On August 26, 2015, Barth was released.

Tampa Bay Buccaneers (second stint)
Barth signed a two-year contract with the Tampa Bay Buccaneers on August 26, 2015. On September 4, 2015, he was released by the Buccaneers.

Barth was resigned by Tampa Bay on October 6, 2015 after the team released starting kicker Kyle Brindza.

On November 8, 2015, Barth kicked a season-high four field goals against the New York Giants.

On May 2, 2016, Barth was released after the Bucs drafted star college kicker Roberto Aguayo in the second round of the 2016 NFL Draft.

New Orleans Saints
On May 19, 2016, it was reported that Barth was on his way to New Orleans to sign with the Saints, where he would compete with the Saints' current kicker Kai Forbath. On September 3, he was released by the Saints after Forbath won the competition.

Chicago Bears
On September 5, 2016, Barth was signed by the Chicago Bears to replace Robbie Gould. On September 18, 2016, in Week 2, Barth missed his first field goal attempt with the Bears against the Philadelphia Eagles.

On March 10, 2017, the Bears re-signed Barth to a one-year contract extension. On November 19, during Week 11 against the Detroit Lions, with only eight seconds left in the fourth quarter, Barth missed a 46-yard field goal attempt as the ball went sailing far right. The Bears lost 27–24. The Bears released Barth and signed Cairo Santos as his replacement the next day. It would be the final NFL game of Barth's career.

NFL career statistics

References

External links

 North Carolina Tar Heels bio
 Tampa Bay Buccaneers bio

1986 births
Living people
Sportspeople from Arlington County, Virginia
Sportspeople from Wilmington, North Carolina
Players of American football from Virginia
Players of American football from North Carolina
American football placekickers
North Carolina Tar Heels football players
Kansas City Chiefs players
Miami Dolphins players
Tampa Bay Buccaneers players
Denver Broncos players
New Orleans Saints players
Chicago Bears players